Football Ontario, formerly known as the Ontario Football Alliance, is the official Provincial Sport Organization of Canadian football in the province of Ontario, based in Guelph. Football Ontario is also a member of Football Canada.

References

Canadian football in Ontario